Highly Distinct is the second studio album by R&B group The Friends of Distinction, released in September 1969 on the RCA Victor label. The album reached No. 14 on the Billboard Top Soul Albums chart.

Covers
On this album The Friends of Distinction covered The Doors' "Light My Fire".

Track listing

Personnel
Harry Elston, Floyd Butler, Jessica Cleaves, Barbara Jean Love – vocals

Charts 
Album

Singles

References 

1969 albums
The Friends of Distinction albums
RCA Records albums